The 2016 Brazil Open Grand Prix was the twelfth Grand Prix's badminton tournament of the 2016 BWF Grand Prix Gold and Grand Prix. The tournament was held at the Costa Cavalcante in Foz do Iguacu, Brazil on 30 August – 4 September 2016 and had a total purse of $55,000.

Men's singles

Seeds

  Zulfadli Zulkiffli (champion)
  Misha Zilberman (semifinal)
  Ygor Coelho De Oliveira (semifinal)
  Anand Pawar (final)

Finals

Top half

Section 1

Section 2

Bottom half

Section 3

Section 4

Women's singles

Seeds

  Beatriz Corrales (champion)
  Airi Mikkelä (final)
  Lohaynny Vicente (withdrew)
  Fabiana Silva (semifinal)

Finals

Top half

Section 1

Section 2

Bottom half

Section 3

Section 4

Men's doubles

Seeds

  Manu Attri / B. Sumeeth Reddy (withdrew)
  Matijs Dierickx / Freek Golinski (semifinal)
  Jones Ralfy Jansen / Josche Zurwonne (final)
  Vilson Vattanirappel / Luka Wraber (second round)

Finals

Top half

Section 1

Section 2

Bottom half

Section 3

Section 4

Women's doubles

Seeds

  Barbara Bellenberg / Eva Janssens (champion)
  Daniela Macias / Danica Nishimura (withdrew)

Finals

Draws

Mixed doubles

Seeds

  Pranaav Jerry Chopra / N. Sikki Reddy (champion)
  Toby Ng / Rachel Honderich (final)
  Hugo Arthuso / Fabiana Silva (second round)
  Diego Mini / Luz Maria Zornoza (withdrew)

Finals

Top half

Section 1

Section 2

Bottom half

Section 3

Section 4

References

External links 
 Tournament Link

BWF Grand Prix Gold and Grand Prix
Brasil Open (badminton)
2016 in Brazilian sport
Brazil Open Grand Prix